Eleodes spinipes is a species of desert stink beetle in the family Tenebrionidae.

Subspecies
These subspecies belong to the species Eleodes spinipes:
 Eleodes spinipes macrura Champion, 1892
 Eleodes spinipes spinipes Solier, 1848
 Eleodes spinipes ventricosa LeConte, 1858

References

Further reading

External links

 

Tenebrionidae